Loretto Academy may refer to:

Loretto Academy (Kansas City, Missouri), listed on the NRHP in Missouri
Loretto Academy (St. Louis, Missouri), listed on the NRHP in St. Louis, Missouri
Loretto Academy (Chicago)
Loretto Academy (El Paso, Texas)
Loretto Academy in Santa Fe, New Mexico, merged with St. Michael's High School sometime after 1967

See also
Loretto (disambiguation), which includes other schools)